Michael Gerard Redman (born 4 March 1966) is a former New Zealand local government administrator and past politician. He was the chief executive of Auckland Tourism, Events and Economic Development, an Auckland Council organisation that came into being in November 2010, until his abrupt resignation in October 2011. He was chief executive of Hamilton City Council from May 2007 to October 2010. He was Mayor of Hamilton from 2004 to May 2007. When he resigned to become the chief executive of Hamilton City Council, he was replaced by deputy mayor and former Member of Parliament Bob Simcock.

In 2006 Michael Redman was a named an Emerging Leader in the Sir Peter Blake Leadership Awards.

Career 
Michael Redman attended school at St John's College in Hamilton and then spent 18 years in business. In 1986 he started his own advertising firm which he ran for 14 years. After the business was acquired in 2000 by Grey Group, he headed the New Zealand branch of the merged business for nearly three years. He was elected to the governing board of the Communication Agencies Association in 2002. Redman was also co-owner and director of a local clothing design, manufacturing and import business and a member of the Institute of Directors.

He started the domestic basketball team New Zealand Breakers, a full-time professional club playing in the Australian National Basketball League, but sold his interest in the club after being elected mayor. He served seven years on the board of the Northern Districts Cricket Association, eventually becoming deputy chairman.

He has served as Deputy Chairman of Parentline Trust and was a member of the Violence Intervention Pilot (VIP) Working Group. He was founding Chairman of Hamilton Combined Foodbanks Trust.

Redman resigned as Hamilton City Council Chief Executive in October 2010 to be chief executive of Auckland Tourism, Events and Economic Development (ATEED), an Auckland Council organisation.

Controversy 
On 27 May 2007 Michael Redman had said "The opportunity to apply for the vacant position for CEO of Hamilton City Council was a rare and special prospect" and it was one that brought V8 Supercar racing to Hamilton. Controversy over costs erupted and Michael Redman resigned from ATEED on 28 October 2011 after a commercial review of the processes followed by Hamilton City Council in relation to the V8 Supercars Event, commissioned by Hamilton Council from Audit New Zealand in February 2011, raised compliance issues and claimed millions of dollars were spent on the Hamilton V8 Supercars stage without council's full knowledge. Michael Redman rejected outright the major findings of the Audit NZ report.

On 1 May 2007 Hamilton City Council announced receipt of a report on compliance costs. Chair of the Finance and Audit Committee Roger Hennebry said that the report was an important step in increasing public awareness about how rates were spent - "Compliance costs are growing and growing and will be an area of expenditure that will go under particular scrutiny at a national level over the coming months." "Whilst the report outlines costs incurred for new legislation it also highlights Council's lost revenue as a result of its inability to generate rates on Crown owned land. We estimate this missed revenue to be valued at $2.1m per year." The report identified 60 new pieces of Government legislation enacted since 2000 and summarises the resulting cost to Council though their implementation. The report summary showed costs under four headings totalling over $3m.

In a case study on the review of the Hamilton V8 Supercar race series Audit New Zealand advised "Audit New Zealand's report on the V8 event could be a good guide for local authorities for managing major events." "In most cities in New Zealand, local government is big business. Many local authorities are aware that their major event will be controversial – even before it starts. This could be because of its size, or its community impact, or the amount of funding involved." "Local authorities should manage all major events on project principles especially around cost, completion times and value. This is particularly important if the event is likely to be costly, or controversial, or both. This, and the regular real-time review of actual performance against the initial business case for the event, is the main lesson from our report." A briefing to a journalist led to publication of contested remarks said to quote from the full report. For example, the suggestion that costs soared from $7m to almost $39m may be compared with section 10.1.9 'Early information on costs' which states (in full): "We were advised by several current and former Councillors during interviews for this review that when the Council committed to the V8 event in 2006 the costs to HCC had been indicated as being $7 million. However, in reviewing this claim we found that the 2006-16 LTCCP referred to the race event as having an infrastructure cost of $7 million together with "the fee to be paid to promoters to run the event". Consequently, Council had clear information at the time it finalised the LTCCP (June 2006) that the total cost for the race event over seven years would be in excess of $20 million. We do not accept that the race event could ever have been understood to be only a $7 million financial commitment to HCC. The passage of time may have led to some misunderstanding about this."

In October 2011 the Hamilton City Council considered legal action against Michael Redman but following legal advice decided against it in private. In a press release on 26 October 2011 former Mayor Bob Simcock said "By placing an unjustified level of blame on staff, and on Michael Redman in particular, the review has achieved council's shameful goal. While I agree with a number of the recommendations the review has made around process, there is nothing in [it] that would have led to a different outcome for the event." "For more than four years every significant decision relating to the event was supported by the unanimous vote of 13 councillors. At the time, and given the information that was available to council, councillors made reasonable decisions. If with the knowledge of hindsight, the community believes we got it wrong, we all share that responsibility. Councillors who blame their decisions on staff are gutless and unfit for public office."

References

Living people
Mayors of Hamilton, New Zealand
1966 births
English emigrants to New Zealand
People educated at St John's College, Hamilton